Satan, in comics, may refer to:

Satan (Image Comics), the ruler of Hell in the Spawn universe
A number of characters who assumed the identity of Satan in the Marvel Universe, in particular Marduk Kurios, who initially went by the name "Satan" and had two children:
Daimon Hellstrom, who goes by the name "Son of Satan" and, after defeating his father, he ruled Hell and became "Satan"
Satana (Marvel Comics), Satan's daughter
Satan, a DC Comics character who appeared in a number of stories in the 1980s, in particular with Deadman in Action Comics
Mr. Satan, a fictional character in the manga series Dragon Ball
Satan's Six, a Topps Comics title, part of Jack Kirby's "Kirbyverse" which centered on the Secret City Saga
The Satan Claw, a weapon used by Baron Strucker

See also
Satan (disambiguation)
Lucifer (comics)
Satannish, a Marvel Comics demon, also named as Satana and Hellstrom's father by Steve Englehart
Satanus (comics), a dinosaur from a number of 2000 AD stories
Lord Satanus, A DC Comics character
Satanika a title from Glenn Danzig's Verotik
Satanis, a DC Comics character also known as Lord Satanis

References